
Kraków County is a unit of territorial administration and local government (powiat) in Lesser Poland Voivodeship, southern Poland. It came into being on January 1, 1999, as a result of the Polish local government reforms passed in 1998. Its administrative seat is the city of Kraków, although the city is not part of the county (it constitutes a separate city with powiat rights).

As of 2019 its total population is 278,219, out of which the population of Skawina is 24,340, that of Krzeszowice is 10,014, that of Słomniki is 4,343, that of Skała is 3,798, that of Świątniki Górne is 2,431, and the rural population is 233,293.

Neighbouring counties
Apart from the city of Kraków, Kraków County is also bordered by Miechów County to the north, Proszowice County and Bochnia County to the east, Wieliczka County to the south-east, Myślenice County to the south, Wadowice County and Chrzanów County to the west, and Olkusz County to the north-west.

Administrative division
The county is subdivided into 17 gminas (five urban-rural and 12 rural). These are listed in the following table, in descending order of population.

Symbols
Kraków's county's symbols can be blazoned as follows:

Coat of arms: 
A traditional Iberian shield gules, an eagle head argent erased beaked, langued and crowned Or.

Flag:
Per fess argent and gules, a narrow fess Or, overall and occupying 3/5 of the flag's height the county's coat of arms.

References

 
Land counties of Lesser Poland Voivodeship